Domenico Maria Corsi (1633 – 6 November 1697) was a Catholic cardinal who served as Bishop of Rimini from 1687 to his death, and as Legate (i.e. Governor) of Romagna from 1687 to 1693.

Life
Domenico Maria Corsi was born in Florence in 1633 to an important Florentine family: his father, Giovanni of Jacopo marquis of Caiazzo, was senator and ambassador of Florence to the Duchy of Milan, and his mother was the marquis Lucrezia Salviati. Domenico Maria studied with support from his uncle Lorenzo Corsi. He graduated in utroque iure in Pisa. 
On 12 April 1657 he joined the Accademia della Crusca, entering the Academy of Florence (former Accademia degli Apatisti) in 1659.

After the death of his uncle, he took up a career in the administration of the Papal States: in 1662 he was made Referendary of the Tribunals of the Apostolic Signature of Justice and of Grace, on 7 March 1664 he was appointed Protonotary apostolic. He was appointed Vice-legato of Ferrara in 1666, Vice-governor of Fermo in 1668, Vice-legato of Urbino in 1673.

In 1675 he purchased the title of clerk of the Apostolic Camera, and on 16 September 1681 he became Auditor Camerae. In Rome he took the offices of General Commissioner of Army, Responsable of the mint and prefect of the Annona with the responsibility for the grain supply to the city of Rome, engaging in these offices with great energy and strong character. He was also the governor of 1676 papal conclave that elected Pope Innocent XI.

On 2 September 1686, Pope Innocent XI appointed him Cardinal deacon with the title of Sant'Eustachio. On 3 March 1687 he was appointed Legate (i.e. Governor) of Romagna. He entered in Ravenna, the capital of Romagna, on 14 June 1687. This office was confirmed on 27 October 1689 for other three years.

On 7 July 1687 he was appointed bishop of the nearby town of Rimini. His episcopal consecration followed on 17 August in the Cathedral of Santa Colomba in Rimini at the hands of the bishops of Cervia, Bertinoro and Montefeltro.

Corsi was a patron for some contemporary artists, such as Mario Balassi and Alessandro Rondoni the Younger. As Legate of Romagna he restored in 1692 the Tomb of Dante. As bishop of Rimini he visited the diocese in 1687, he erected along with the town council an hospital and the seminary, in 1692 he built a chapel dedicated to S. Maria del Rifugio aside the old cathedral, and in 1696 he held a diocesan synod.

On 3 December 1696 he was promoted to Cardinal priest with the title of San Pietro in Montorio. He was Camerlengo of the Sacred College of Cardinals from 14 January 1697 until his death. He died in Rimini on 6 November 1697, and he was buried in the cathedral of that town.

Notes

References

1633 births
1697 deaths
17th-century Italian cardinals
17th-century Italian Roman Catholic bishops
Clergy from Florence
Bishops of Rimini
Domenico Maria Corsi